Toshio Yuasa (born October 3, 1935) was Grand Steward of the Imperial Household Agency (2001–2005). He was a graduate of the University of Tokyo.

References

University of Tokyo alumni
1935 births
Living people
Place of birth missing (living people)